Eneodes is a genus of beetles in the family Cerambycidae, containing the following species:

 Eneodes hirsuta Fisher, 1926
 Eneodes viridulus Fisher, 1942

References

Acanthocinini